Tangos may refer to:

 "Tangos" (song), a song popularized in Spain
 Tangos (district), a district or barangay in Navotas, Philippines
 Tangos (album), a 1973 album by Buenos Aires 8
 Tangos (Rubén Blades album), a 2014 album by Rubén Blades

See also
 Tango (disambiguation)